Coming Back to Me: The Autobiography of Marcus Trescothick is the 2008 autobiography of former England Test cricketer Marcus Trescothick, written with Peter Hayter. The book summarises Trescothick's cricketing exploits, from his childhood fantasies through to his international successes, but focuses on the trouble that he suffered when touring overseas, and the resulting depression that caused him to retire from international cricket.

The book was named William Hill Sports Book of the Year 2008, becoming just the second autobiography to win the award. Co-founder of the prize, Graham Sharpe, said that: "The judges felt it fearlessly tackled one of the great taboos of elite sport." It was also shortlisted for the "Best Autobiography" at the British Sports Book Awards 2009, and the "Biography of the Year" at the 2009 National Book Awards.

References

Cricket books
British biographies
Sports autobiographies
HarperCollins books
William Hill Sports Book of the Year winning works
2008 non-fiction books